Nadine Muzerall (born October 19, 1978) is Minnesota's all-time leader with 139 career goals, including a record 40 power-play goals. She was a member of the inaugural team of University of Minnesota women's hockey. She is currently the head coach at Ohio State University.

Playing career
In her freshman season, she had a 32-goal, 32-assist performance to earn Women's Hockey News Second Team All-American, Patty Kazmaier Award Finalist and team most valuable player accolades.

During her 1998-99 sophomore season, Muzerall was named a Second Team AWCHA All-American, and was part of the third-place finish at the 1999 AWCHA National Championship. She compiled totals of 30 goals, 18 assists and 48 points. Her numbers ranked in the top 20 nationally in seven offensive categories.

Muzerall scored the game-winning goal in the 2000 national championship win over Brown (Minnesota would win 4–2) and earned all-tournament honors with three goals and an assist in two games. For the season, Muzerall scored  49 goals, 28 assists and 77 points. Her 49 goals led the nation, power-play goals (16), power-play points (27) and game-winning goals (9). Her 49 goals sit atop the Minnesota season record book. In a 10–0 win over Bemidji State, Muzerall set school records with five goals and seven points. During the season, Muzerall went on a 20-game point streak, earned First Team All-WCHA and Minnesota team most valuable player honors.

Muzerall finished her collegiate career in 2000–01. She was part of the first ever WCHA Regular Season Championship, with contributions of 28 goals and 18 assists. For her efforts, she was named a Patty Kazmaier Award Finalist for the second time in her career. In the Minnesota career record book, Muzerall finished her career first in goals (139), goals-per-game (1.08), power-play goals (40) and shots (726), third in points (235), fourth in plus/minus (+149), fifth in shorthanded goals (4) and sixth in assists (96). She graduated with a degree in family social science.

International
She was invited to attend Canada's National Women's Team Evaluation Camp from October 3–10, 2000. During the 2009–10 season, she played for Lugano in the Regio League in Switzerland.

Coaching career
In the aftermath of her NCAA career in 2001, she taught an Introduction to Ice Hockey class in the kinesiology department during the 2001–02 academic year at the University of Minnesota. In 2003, she became head coach of the Northfield Mount Hermon School girls’ hockey team in Gill, Massachusetts. In 2007, Muzerall coached at the Digit Murphy Hockey Camp at Brown University. Previously, she was a camp director at the Florida Hockey Camp in Orlando, Florida. Starting in 2008, Muzerall has coached at the Hill Hockey Clinic in Newburyport, Massachusetts. She instructed players on skating fundamentals along with off-ice training. On October 27, 2011, it was announced that she became an assistant coach for the Minnesota Golden Gophers women's ice hockey team. She would capture Frozen Four titles in 2012, 2013, 2015 and 2016.

Muzerall was named an assistant coach of Canada's National Women's Development Team for the 2016–17 season. She has served as a coach in prior years at selection camps for Canada's National Women's Development Team and Canada's National Women's Under-18 Team.

Muzerall was named as the head coach of the Ohio State women's hockey team prior to the 2016–17 season. She helped guide the team to the school's first NCAA tournament and Frozen Four appearance in 2018. On March 8, 2020, the Buckeyes won the WCHA championship for the first time in the program's history. On March 20, 2022, the Buckeyes won the NCAA Women's Hockey National Championship for the first time in the program's history.

Awards and honors
USCHO.com, Offensive Player Of the Week (Week of December 1, 1998)
 1998—Nominee for Patty Kazmaier Memorial Award 
1999 American Women's College Hockey Alliance All-Americans, Second Team
 On Sept. 27, 2007, Nadine Muzerall and former teammate Erica Killewald were inducted into the University of Minnesota's "M" Club Hall of Fame. The duo were the first women's hockey players to be inducted into the hall of fame and the youngest in the group of 13.
2022 WCHA Coach of the Year

Personal
Her hockey gloves were on display in 2011 at the Hockey Hall of Fame in Toronto, Ontario.

References

1978 births
Living people
Ice hockey coaches
Ice hockey people from Ontario
Minnesota Golden Gophers women's ice hockey players
Sportspeople from Mississauga
Canadian ice hockey forwards
Ohio State Buckeyes women's ice hockey coaches